On 6 June 1993, four armed individuals intruded into Prashanthi Nilayam, Sathya Sai Baba's main ashram. Sai Baba was unharmed during the incident.

Mr. Indulal Shah, chief functionary of the Sathya Sai Central Trust was quoted in the press as stating "the matter is purely internal and we do not wish to have any law enforcement agency investigating into it." However, it is currently unknown whether the murdered men were targets or assailants.

Intruder incident analysis
The incident was widely published in the Indian press. In the BBC documentary it was stated that "some police officers were arrested but were never charged and that the case was eventually dropped." The police version claimed that the assailants charged at the police with daggers and were all shot dead. A Central Bureau of Investigation report stated that the official police report was riddled with lies and inconsistencies. V.P.B. Nair (Former Secretary to the Home Minister of Andhra Pradesh) also opined that the official police report contained inconsistencies.

References

Murder in India
Crime in Andhra Pradesh
1993 murders in India